Nucella dubia, common name the common dogwhelk, is a species of sea snail, a marine gastropod mollusk in the family Muricidae, the murex snails or rock snails.

Description

Distribution
This marine species occurs off Namibia and off the South Coast and West Coast of South Africa.

References

 Houart R., Kilburn R.N. & Marais A.P. (2010) Muricidae. pp. 176–270, in: Marais A.P. & Seccombe A.D. (eds), Identification guide to the seashells of South Africa. Volume 1. Groenkloof: Centre for Molluscan Studies. 376 pp

Muricidae
Gastropods described in 1848
Taxa named by Christian Ferdinand Friedrich Krauss